Adrian Hubbard (born February 27, 1992) is a former American football linebacker. He played college football at Alabama.

College career
As a redshirt sophomore in 2012, Hubbard had seven sacks, including one in the 2013 BCS National Championship Game. He led Alabama in sacks (7), tackles for loss (11) and forced fumbles (3). Hubbard recorded a sack in each of Alabama's last three games (Auburn, Georgia and Notre Dame). His 7.0 sacks ranked sixth in the SEC this season. After his junior season in 2013, he entered the 2014 NFL Draft.

College career statistics

Professional career

Green Bay Packers
After going undrafted in the 2014 NFL Draft, Hubbard signed with the Green Bay Packers on May 12, 2014.

Winnipeg Blue Bombers
Hubbard played for the Winnipeg Blue Bombers of the Canadian Football League in 2016.

Alternative leagues
He participated in The Spring League in 2017.

In October 2019, Hubbard was selected by the Los Angeles Wildcats in the 2020 XFL Draft.

References

External links
Green Bay Packers bio
Alabama Crimson Tide bio

1992 births
Living people
People from Lawrenceville, Georgia
Sportspeople from the Atlanta metropolitan area
Players of American football from Georgia (U.S. state)
Players of American football from Washington, D.C.
African-American players of American football
American football linebackers
Alabama Crimson Tide football players
Green Bay Packers players
The Spring League players
African-American players of Canadian football
Canadian football linebackers
Winnipeg Blue Bombers players
21st-century African-American sportspeople